Ramakrishna Mission Shilpapitha, established in 1958, is a government sponsored polytechnic located in Belgharia, North 24 Parganas district, West Bengal.

About college
This polytechnic is affiliated to the West Bengal State Council of Technical Education, and recognised by AICTE, New Delhi and managed by Ramakrishna Mission, Belur. This polytechnic offers diploma courses in Electrical, Electronics and Telecommunication, Mechanical and Civil Engineering.

See also

References

External links
 Admission to Polytechnics in West Bengal for Academic Session 2006-2007
http://www.rkmshilpapitha.org/
Official website WBSCTE

Universities and colleges in North 24 Parganas district
Educational institutions established in 1958
1958 establishments in West Bengal
Technical universities and colleges in West Bengal